The Rt Hon. Richard Butler, 2nd Earl of Glengall (17 May 1794 – 22 June 1858), styled Viscount Cahir between January 1816 and January 1819, was an Irish Tory politician and peer.

The son of The 1st Earl of Glengall and Emily Jefferys, on 17 July 1818, then-Viscount Cahir was elected as the Member of Parliament for Tipperary. Seven months later he succeeded to his father's title and resigned his seat. On 1 September 1829, Lord Glengall was elected as an Irish representative peer, in succession to The 1st Earl of Blessington, and took his seat in the House of Lords on the Tory benches in February 1830.

On 20 February 1834, Lord Glengall married Margaret Lauretta Mellish, the daughter of William Mellish, and together they had two daughters. Having no male issue, his titles (including the Cahir Barony of 1583) became extinct upon his death in 1858.

References

1794 births
1858 deaths
Richard
Conservative Party (UK) hereditary peers
Earls in the Peerage of Ireland
Irish representative peers
UK MPs 1818–1820
UK MPs who inherited peerages
Members of the Parliament of the United Kingdom for County Tipperary constituencies (1801–1922)
Tory members of the Parliament of the United Kingdom